The 1924 NFL season was the fifth regular season of the National Football League. The league had 18 teams play during the season, including the new clubs Frankford Yellow Jackets, Kansas City Blues, and Kenosha Maroons. The Louisville Brecks, Oorang Indians, St. Louis All Stars and Toledo Maroons folded.

Before the season, the owner of the now-defunct Cleveland Indians bought the Canton Bulldogs and "mothballed" it, taking the team's nickname and players to Cleveland for the season. The new team, the Cleveland Bulldogs, won the 1924 NFL title with a 7–1–1 record.

Teams
Eighteen teams competed in the NFL during the 1924 season.

Championship race
The Cleveland Bulldogs, Buffalo Bisons, Frankford Yellow Jackets, Green Bay Packers and Chicago Bears were the contenders for the title in November. 

However, Buffalo faltered down the stretch, dropping their last three games to drop from 6–2 to 6–5, finishing squarely in the middle of the pack, and Green Bay similarly fell from 6–2 to 7–4. This left Cleveland and Chicago to contend for the title, since Frankford had two losses and the other two teams only one. Teams such as the Duluth Kelleys and the Rock Island Independents would have been contenders for the title, but their more limited schedules (six games for Duluth and nine for Rock Island) effectively ruled them out of title contention.

The official end of the season was designated as November 30, 1924, with Cleveland atop the league standings. After this date, Chicago challenged Cleveland to a post-season rematch and won, setting up a repeat of 1921, when the Bears (at that time still known as the Staleys) were able to win the championship from Buffalo (at the time known as the All-Americans) using the same tactic: this time, however, league officials declared any game after November 30 to be effectively exhibition games, null and void with regard to the season standings, which allowed the Bulldogs to keep their title.

In terms of pure win–loss differential, the Yellow Jackets would have easily won the title, as they had nine more wins than losses, compared to the +6 of the Bulldogs and the +5 of the Bears. 

Had the current (post-1972) system of counting ties as half-a-win and half-a-loss been in force in 1924, the Kelleys (5–1) would have tied with the Bulldogs (7–1–1) for the league title at .833, with the tiebreaker not applicable as the Kelleys and Bulldogs did not play each other, while the Yellow Jackets (11–2–1) would have finished third at .821, with the Bears (6–1–4) finishing fourth at .727.

Standings

References
 NFL Record and Fact Book
 NFL History 1921–1930 (Last accessed December 4, 2005)
 Total Football: The Official Encyclopedia of the National Football League

1924